Primera dama (lit: First Lady), is a Chilean television soap opera created by Sebastián Arrau, that aired on Canal 13 from August 30, 2010, to March 9, 2011, starring Celine Reymond, Julio Milostich, Mario Horton, and Catalina Guerra.

Cast 
 Celine Reymond as Sabina Astudillo.
 Julio Milostich as Leonardo Santander.
 Catalina Guerra as Bruna San Juan.
 Mario Horton as Mariano Zamora.
 Carolina Arregui as Estrella Soto.
 Eduardo Paxeco as Caetano Bello.
 Luciana Echeverría as Cristina Santander.
 Pablo Schwarz as Domingo Fernández.
 César Sepúlveda as Aníbal Urrutia.
 Lorena Bosch as Sandra Burr.
 Pablo Macaya as Federico Astudillo.
 Daniela Lhorente as Paula Méndez.
 Nicolás Poblete as Ángel Astudillo.
 Javiera Díaz de Valdés as Luciana Cuadra.
 Renato Münster as José Astudillo "El Diablo".
 Gabriela Hernández as Mirza Pérez.
 Teresita Reyes as Engracia Loyola.
 Natalie Dujovne as Emma Astudillo.
 Diego Ruiz as Diego Santander.
 Elvira Cristi as Rafaela Fonseca.
 Teresa Münchmeyer as Hortensia Soto.
 María de los Ángeles García as Nancy Ramírez.
 Lucy Cominetti as Juanita Ramírez.
 Silvana Salgueiro as Corina Molina.

International versions
The international rights are distributed by Latin Media Corporation.

References

External links 
  
 

2010 telenovelas
Chilean telenovelas
2010 Chilean television series debuts
2011 Chilean television series endings
Canal 13 (Chilean TV channel) telenovelas
Spanish-language telenovelas
Television shows set in Santiago